Qaleh Sar (also Romanized as Qal‘eh Sar) is a village in Tameshkol Rural District, Nashta District, Tonekabon County, Mazandaran Province, Iran. At the 2006 census, its population was 179, in 44 families.

References 

Populated places in Tonekabon County